Farfantepenaeus duorarum is a species of marine penaeid shrimp found around Bermuda, along the east coast of the United States and in the Gulf of Mexico. They are a significant commercial species in the United States and Cuba.

Distribution
Farfantepenaeus duorarum are found in the Atlantic around Bermuda, along the coast of the United States from Massachusetts to Texas, and along the Mexican coast from Tamaulipas to Campeche. Juveniles are found in marine or estuarine waters, while adults are marine.

Description

Fishery

Taxonomy
Farfantepenaeus duorarum was first described by Martin Burkenroad in 1939, under the name Penaeus duorarum. It was transferred to Farfantepenaeus when that new genus was erected by Rudolf N. Burukovsky in 1997. The FAO's preferred name for the species is northern pink shrimp; other common names, used in the USA, are pink shrimp, spotted shrimp, pink-spotted shrimp, brown-spotted shrimp, grooved shrimp, green shrimp, pink night shrimp, red shrimp, hopper, skipper, pushed shrimp and bait shrimp.

Notes

Further reading
 Holthuis L. B. (1980) Shrimps and Prawns of the World. An Annotated Catalogue of Species of Interest to Fisheries, FAO Fisheries Synopsis No.125, Volume 1.

Penaeidae
Crustaceans of the Atlantic Ocean
Crustaceans described in 1939